Linda McCulloch (born December 21, 1954) is an American politician who is formerly the secretary of state of Montana. She was the first woman to serve in that post. She left her previous post as state superintendent of public instruction due to term limits, which she also reached as Secretary of State.

Political career 
McCulloch is a Democrat and was elected to the office in November 2008 and took office in January 2009. She defeated Republican Brad Johnson. McCulloch previously served as state superintendent of public instruction from 2000 to 2008, before reaching the term limit. From 1995 to 2000, she had been a representative in the Montana House of Representatives.

McCulloch's initial campaign was based on increasing voter participation and supporting state businesses. Early in her first term, McCulloch oversaw a project to update the records system for 40,000 boxes of the state's stored documents from a 1978 mainframe to modern software, based on her background as a school librarian, in order to allow web-based communication between businesses and the Secretary of State. She also backed legislation to update state notary documentation and requirements.

McCulloch supported online voter registration in Montana throughout both of her terms, with the caveat of requiring a valid Montana ID to register online.

In 2016, the Montana Secretary of State's Office added increased satellite offices in reservation areas to improve voting access after a 2012 tribal suit over equitable voting access, which McCulloch viewed as a start for improving access. Community leaders and county election officials also pressed the need for more publicity over the new voting offices to increase turnout. The Office also saw increases in absentee voting during this same time period. McCulloch opposed a measure to remove same-day voter registration in Montana, which Montana citizens also ultimately voted against.

McCulloch won re-election in 2012 for another 4-year term. She was ineligible to run again in 2016 due to term limits, and was succeeded by Republican Corey Stapleton.

She currently serves on the Board of Advisors of Let America Vote, an organization founded by former Missouri Secretary of State Jason Kander that aims to end voter suppression.

Personal life 
McCulloch was born in Springfield, Ohio, and grew up in South Charleston, Ohio. She graduated from Southeastern High School, and attended OSU. In 1982, she received her BA in Elementary Education from the University of Montana, followed in 1990 by her MA in Elementary Education from the same institution. She has previously worked as a paraprofessional teacher, substitute teacher, school librarian, and teacher. She is divorced.

Electoral history

References

External links
Official site

1954 births
21st-century American politicians
21st-century American women politicians
Living people
Democratic Party members of the Montana House of Representatives
Politicians from Springfield, Ohio
Secretaries of State of Montana
University of Montana alumni
Superintendents of Public Instruction of Montana
Women state legislators in Montana
Women in Montana politics
Educators from Ohio
American women educators